Rose-Lynn Fisher (born 1955) is a Los Angeles-based American photographer known for her series Bee and The Topography of Tears.

Personal life
Fisher was born in Minneapolis, Minnesota, in 1955. She studied at Otis Art Institute in Los Angeles, California, receiving her BFA in 1978; she also studied at UCLA and UCSC. She was trained as a painter. She lives in Los Angeles.

Work
Fisher's interests have included microphotography, using both a scanning electron microscope (SEM), and an optical microscope; also aerial photography, photographic research in Morocco, and mixed media painting including geometric patterns and collage.

While studying at Otis Art Institute, Fisher began to focus on geometric patterns and sacred geometry (geometry found in sacred art and architecture). Her fascination with geometric patterns has led her to explore them throughout her career. Through her work with SEMs and bees, she began to focus on hexagons.

Fisher's use of SEMs for photographing bees has touched on the disciplines of art and science. She compiled her photographs into the book Bee (2010).

In 2008 Fisher began to photograph tears with an optical microscope, for her book The Topography of Tears (2017). She sampled over a hundred, varying from "onion" tears to a variety of emotional tears.

Publications

Publications by Fisher
Bee. New York: Princeton Architectural Press: 2010. . With a foreword by Verlyn Klinkenborg.
The Topography of Tears. New York: Bellevue Literary Press, 2017. . With forewords by William Frey II and Ann Lauterbach.

Publications with contributions by Fisher
Both Sides of Sunset: Photographing Los Angeles. New York: Metropolis Books, 2015. . Edited by Jane Brown and Marla Hamburg Kennedy. With an introduction by David Ulin and a foreword by Ed Ruscha
Where Honeybees Thrive: Stories from the Field. University Park, PA: Penn State University Press, 2017. By Heather Swan. .

Solo exhibition
Fowler Museum, University of California, Los Angeles, 2006.

References

External links
Fisher's website

1955 births
Living people
Artists from Minneapolis
American photographers
American women photographers
Microscopists
Otis College of Art and Design alumni
University of California, Santa Cruz alumni
University of California, Los Angeles alumni
21st-century American women